We Belong to the Imperial and Royal Infantry Regiment (German:Wir sind vom K. u. K. Infanterie-Regiment) is a 1926 German silent film starring Mary Kid, Paul Heidemann and Fritz Spira. The film's art direction was by Heinrich Richter. Oswald, an Austrian by birth, intended it as a tribute to the atmosphere of Imperial Vienna.

Cast

See also 
 Imperial and Royal Infantry

References

Bibliography
Prawer, S.S. Between Two Worlds: The Jewish Presence in German and Austrian Film, 1910–1933. Berghahn Books, 2005.

External links

1926 films
Films of the Weimar Republic
German silent feature films
Films directed by Richard Oswald
Films set in Vienna
Films set in the 1900s
German black-and-white films
Bavaria Film films